Alla Kravets (Алла Кравець; born 12 January 1973) is a Ukrainian volleyball player.

She was part of the Ukraine women's national volleyball team at the 1996 Summer Olympics. 
She also competed at the 1994 FIVB Volleyball Women's World Championship and 2001 Women's European Volleyball Championship. On club level she played with Olexandria Bila.

Clubs
 Olexandria Bila (1994)

References

External links
 
 
 
 http://www.cev.lu/Competition-Area/PlayerDetails.aspx?TeamID=7030&PlayerID=19354&ID=51
 http://www.todor66.com/volleyball/Olympics/Women_1996.html
 http://www.todor66.com/volleyball/Europe/Women_2001.html

1973 births
Living people
Ukrainian women's volleyball players
Sportspeople from Zaporizhzhia
Volleyball players at the 1996 Summer Olympics
Olympic volleyball players of Ukraine